Catagela is a genus of moths of the family Crambidae.

Species
Catagela adjurella Walker, 1863
Catagela adoceta Common, 1960
Catagela subdotatella Inoue, 1982

References

External links

Schoenobiinae
Crambidae genera
Taxa named by Francis Walker (entomologist)